Pádraig Pearse's GAA is a Gaelic Athletic Association club located in the Ballymacward-Gurteen parish in County Galway, Ireland. The club was founded in 1966, when the Gurteen and Ballymacward Junior Hurling clubs merged and was predominantly concerned with the game of hurling. There has always been a strong tradition of hurling in the parish, with one of the earliest recordings in local press dated to 1882. The first club in the parish was officially affiliated to the G.A.A. in 1886. Pádraig Pearse's GAA fields hurling teams from Under-6 to Senior level. Hurling Players from the club have represented Galway at all levels. In 2013 St Kerrill's Gaelic Football Club, which had been formed in 1990 and also representing the Ballymacward and Gurteen areas, was disbanded and Pádraig Pearses began fielding football teams. The footballers compete at Junior level, with teams also affiliated at several underage levels amalgamated with Menlough GAA.

Notable players
 Cyril Donnellan, member of 2017 Galway All-Ireland Senior Hurling Championship winning panel. Player on Galway National Hurling League winning teams of 2010 and 2017.
 Michael King, member of 1980 Galway All-Ireland Senior Hurling Championship winning panel.
 Marty Barrett, forward on 1972 Galway All-Ireland Under 21 Hurling Championship and 1975 National Hurling League winning teams.
 Fr Nicholas Murray, midfielder on 1959 and 1960 Fohenagh Galway Senior Club Hurling Championship winning team. Murray played Senior hurling with neighbouring Fohenagh, as there was no Senior Club in Gurteen-Ballymacward at the time.
 Tom Cogavin, member on 1923 Galway All-Ireland Senior Hurling Championship winning panel.

Honours

Hurling
 Galway Senior East Board Hurling Championship (1): 1969
 Galway Senior Hurling League (1): 2018
 Connacht Intermediate Club Hurling Championship (1): 2010
 Galway Intermediate Hurling Championship (4): 1979, 1991, 1995, 2010
 Galway Junior Hurling Championship (3): 1919 (Gurteen), 1941 (Ballymacward), 1967.
 Galway Junior B Club Hurling Championship (1): 2009
 Galway Under-21 B Hurling Championship (1): 2005
 Galway Minor A Hurling Championship (1): 1977
 Galway Minor B Hurling Championship (1): 2007

Football
 Galway Junior Football Championship (1): 2008 (St Kerrill's).

External links
Pádraig Pearse's GAA site

References

Gaelic games clubs in County Galway
Hurling clubs in County Galway